Apaches is a Spanish drama television series starring Alberto Ammann, Eloy Azorín and Verónica Echegui. Produced by New Atlantis for Atresmedia, it was however globally released by Netflix in September 2017, only to be broadcast on the free-to-air channel Antena 3 in Spain later, in early 2018.

Premise 
The story is set in the 1990s, in the "gritty" district of Tetuán, Madrid. Miguel (Alberto Ammann) has left the working-class neighborhood behind and has become a promising journalist based on the centre of Madrid, living with Cris (Elena Ballesteros), a lawyer. However, after his father becomes the victim of a fraud that ruined him, Miguel is forced to return to the neighborhood and turn into a criminal in order to save his family and avenge his father. There he meets his childhood friend Sastre (Eloy Azorín), a lowkey criminal in a relationship with Miranda (Ingrid García-Jonsson), and the two friends enter a rampage of robberies and burglaries. Everything goes as planned until the emergence of Carol (Verónica Echegui), the girlfriend of the dangerous criminal boss "El Chatarrero" (Paco Tous), threatens to jeopardise their plans.

Cast 
 Alberto Ammann as Miguel.
 Eloy Azorín as Sastre.
 Verónica Echegui as Carol.
 Ingrid García-Jonsson as Miranda.
 Paco Tous as El Chatarrero.
  as Dela.
 Edgar Costas as Boris.
 Elena Ballesteros as Cris.
 Claudia Traisac as Vicky.
 Lucía Jiménez as Teresa.
  as Miguel's father.
 Nerea Barros as Silvia.

Production and release  
Atresmedia's flagship channel Antena 3 announced its intention to adapt the Miguel Sáez Carral's novel Apaches (Planeta, 2014) in May 2014. Adapted from Sáez Carral's novel, the screenplay was written by Sáez himself in collaboration with Carlos Montero and María López Castaño. Daniel Calparsoro, Alberto Ruiz Rojo and Miguel Ángel Vivas co-directed the series (Calparsoro episodes 1–4, Ruiz Rojo episodes 5–8 and Vivas episodes 9–12).

Shooting locations included the Fuerte de San Francisco housing area in Guadalajara, as well as Fuencarral and Villaverde in Madrid.

The pilot was pre-screened in 2015  and the release of the series was tentatively scheduled for Autumn 2015, yet Atresmedia eventually shelved the 12-episode series. The media group later reached an agreement with Netflix for the distribution of the series, which was subsequently made available to the global market on 8 September 2017. The first episode eventually aired in Spain on Antena 3 on 8 January 2018, after its release on Netflix. The original free-to-air run in Antena 3 ended on 26 March 2018.

Free-to-air run on Antena 3

References 

2017 Spanish television series debuts
2017 Spanish television series endings
Television shows filmed in Spain
Television shows set in Madrid
Television series set in the 1990s
Television series based on Spanish novels
Spanish-language Netflix original programming
2010s Spanish drama television series
2010s crime drama television series
Robbery in television
Spanish thriller television series